Ewing Township may refer to the following places in the United States:

 Ewing Township, Boone County, Arkansas
 Ewing Township, Franklin County, Illinois
 Ewing Township, Michigan
 Ewing Township, Holt County, Nebraska
 Ewing Township, New Jersey

Township name disambiguation pages